During the 1993–94 English football season, Middlesbrough F.C. competed in the Football League First Division.

Season summary
In the 1993–94 season, Middlesbrough started promisingly with 6 wins from their first 12 league games and by near the end of October where in 3rd place but a poor run of just 1 win in their next 11 league games, saw Middlesbrough slide down to 13th and end their hopes of automatic promotion which saw them finish in a disappointing 9th place and on 2 May 1994, Lawrence confirmed his departure at the end of the season. Upon leaving he helped young chairman Steve Gibson contact his replacement Bryan Robson.

Also at the end of the season, Henderson was succeeded as chairman of the club by lifelong fan Steve Gibson, who helped save Middlesbrough from liquidation in 1986 by forming a consortium and seven years later bought Scottish & Newcastle's shares in the club as well as now owning roughly 90% of the club.

Final league table

Results
Middlesbrough's score comes first

Legend

Football League First Division

FA Cup

League Cup

Anglo-Italian Cup

Squad

References

Middlesbrough F.C. seasons
Middlesbrough